Comic Sans  is a 2018 Croatian comedy-drama film directed by Nevio Marasović.

The film premiered at the 46th FEST International Film Festival in Belgrade.

Comic Sans is the fourth film project by Nevio Marasović shot on Vis and the first Croatian feature to be shot on the remote Croatian island of Jabuka.

Plot    
A successful graphic designer Alan Despot (Janko Popović Volarić), after trying in vain to renew a broken relationship with his girlfriend (Nataša Janjić) experiences an emotional breakdown. Persuaded by his concerned mother (Alma Prica) he goes to the island of Vis with his estranged and eccentric father (Zlatko Burić) to arrange a funeral for their deceased aunt. There he meets another ex-girlfriend (Inti Šraj) and her fiancé (Miha Rodman). New situations and circumstances help Alan to view his own life from a new perspective.

Cast  
 Janko Popović Volarić as  Alan
 Zlatko Burić as Bruno
 Nataša Janjić as Marina 
 Miloš Timotijević as Lukas 
 Alma Prica as Vesna 
 Inti Šraj as Barbara 
 Jette Ostan Vejrup as Anne
 Sara Hjort Ditlevsen as Sofie
 Miha Rodman as Peter
 Tanja Ribič as Urška
 Damir Poljičak as Pape

Awards

 Alexandria International Film Festival 2018, Alexandria, Egypt - official competition - award for best actor (Janko Popović Volarić)
 Actor's festival in Mojkovac 2018, Mojkovac, Montenegro - award for the best male role (Janko Popović Volarić)
 Sombor Film Festival 2018, Sombor, Serbia - competition program - best film award
 32nd Montenegro Film Festival 2018, Herceg Novi, Montenegro - FEDEORA award of the Federation of Film Critics of Europe and the Mediterranean
 Pula Film Festival 2018, Pula, Croatia - Golden Arena for Best Director (Nevio Marasović), Golden Arena for Best Actor (Janko Popović Volarić), Golden Arena for Best Supporting Actress (Nataša Janjić), Golden Arena for Editing (Tomislav Pavlic), Golden Arena for Sound Design (Julij Zornik), Golden Gate of Pula Audience Award
 Ceau, Cinema! 2018, Timișoara and Gottlob, Romania - competition program - Audience Award
 Film for A!, Private art gymnasium award for best film 2018, Zagreb, Croatia
 FEST International Film Festival 2018, Belgrade, Serbia - main competition program - Jury Award for the best film in the region given by film critics 'Nebojša Đukelić'

Other festival screenings
 Guwahati International Film Festival 2018, Guwahati, India - programme World Cinema
 Oaxaca FilmFest 2018, Oaxaca, Mexico - official competition
 Raindance Film Festival 2018, London, United Kingdom - non-competitive programme Narratives
 Manaki Brothers Film Festival 2018, Skopje, Macedonia - programme "European Cinema Perspectives"
 LIFFE - Leskovac International Film Festival 2018, Leskovac, Serbia
 Betina Film Festival 2018, Betina, Croatia
 Dalmatia Film Festival 2018, towns of Dalmatia, Croatia
 Film Meetings in Niš 2018, Niš, Serbia
 19th Mediteran Film Festival 2018, Široki Brijeg, Bosnia and Herzegovina - non-competitive programme
 Prishtina International Film Festival 2018, Priština, Kosovo - competition programme "Honey and Blood"
 International Film Festival Tonneins 2018, Tonneins, France - official selection
 Five Days of Zagreb in Sarajevo 2018, Sarajevo, Bosnia and Herzegovina
 Philadelphia Independent Film Festival 2018, Philadelphia, United States
 South East European Film Festival 2018, Los Angeles, USA - program "Feature Program"
 LET’S CEE Film Festival 2018, Vienna, Austria - program Artis International
 European Union Film Festival 2020, Ottawa, Canada

References

External links  
  
 Official site
 Comic Sans on Kinorama

2018 comedy-drama films
Croatian comedy-drama films
2018 films
2010s Croatian-language films
Films set on islands